Halo is the fourteenth studio album by Finnish heavy metal band Amorphis, released worldwide on 11 February 2022 through Atomic Fire Records.

Critical reception

Track listing

Personnel

Amorphis
 Tomi Joutsen – lead vocals
 Esa Holopainen – lead guitar
 Tomi Koivusaari – rhythm guitar, backing vocals
 Olli-Pekka Laine – bass
 Santeri Kallio – keyboards
 Jan Rechberger – drums, keyboards

Miscellaneous staff
 Francesco Ferrini – orchestrations, keyboards
 Noa Gruman – female vocals
 Jesse Bartholomew Zuretti – orchestrations, keyboards
 Erik Mjörnell – guitars (track 11)
 Oskari Auramo – percussion
 Jan Rechberger – percussion
 Petronella Nettermalm – female vocals (track 11)

Production and art
 Jens Bogren – producer
 Pekka Kainulainen – lyrics
 Sam Jamsen – photography
 Metastazis – artwork, design
 Tony Lindgren – mastering
 Linus Corneliusson – mixing, editing
 Ricardo Borges – mixing, editing
 Ikevil – lyrics translation

Charts

References

2022 albums
Amorphis albums
Albums produced by Jens Bogren